The Catholic organisation Opus Dei is made up of several different types of membership:

Types of membership
Quoting the Twitter account @OpusDeiProblems, USA:  in visit from Rome (central headquarters of Opus), the Vicar admits: 

Canon Law experts and the Pope hold that ONLY THE CLERGY are part of the Prelature.  The Nums, Assocs, and Supers are not members of Opus.

Opus Dei is made up of several different types of faithful. According to the Statutes of Opus Dei, the distinction derives from the degree to which they make themselves available for the official activities of the Prelature and for giving formation according to the spirit of Opus Dei.

Supernumeraries
Supernumeraries, the largest type, currently account for about 70% of the total membership. The term "supernumerary" is a civil designation for an additional member of a society, for example professors, judges, actors, etc.

Typically, the supernumeraries of the Opus Dei prelature are married men and women who have secular careers and lead traditional family lives. Supernumeraries devote a portion of their day to prayer, in addition to attending regular meetings and taking part in activities such as retreats.  Due to their career and family obligations, supernumeraries are not as available to the organization as the other types of members, but they typically contribute financially to Opus Dei, and they lend other types of assistance as their circumstances permit.  Unlike other types of members, supernumeraries are not required to be celibate.

Numeraries
Numeraries, the second largest type of members of Opus Dei, comprise about 20% of total membership.  Numeraries are celibate members who give themselves in "full availability" (plena disponibilitas) for the official undertakings of the Prelature. This includes full availability for giving doctrinal and ascetical formation to other members, for staffing the internal government of Opus Dei if asked by the regional directors, and for moving to other countries to start or help with apostolic activities if asked by the Prelate. Because they are making themselves fully available to do whatever needs to be done for the undertakings of the Prelature, numeraries are expected to live in special centers run by Opus Dei, and the question of which particular center a numerary will live in depends upon the regional needs. "Numerary" is a general term for persons who form part of the permanent staff of an organization. Therefore, in order to maintain a family atmosphere in the centers (rather than an institutional one), it is considered very important for numeraries to participate in daily meals and "get-togethers" in which they converse and share news.  Both men and women may become numeraries in the Opus Dei prelature, although the centers are gender-segregated, with only minimal contact between male and female numeraries.  Numeraries generally have jobs outside of Opus Dei, although some are asked to work internally full-time and many modify the way that they go about pursuing their professional goals in order to be available for the Prelature.  According to Opus Dei's 1982 statutes, potential numeraries ordinarily "ought to have a civil academic degree or professional equivalent, or be able, at least, to obtain one after the admission"

Numerary assistants
Numerary assistants are a type of numerary that exists in the Women's Branch of Opus Dei. Their full availability for the Prelature is lived out as full availability for doing a specific type of work, namely looking after the domestic needs of the conference centers and the residential centers of Opus Dei.  Hence they live in special centers run by Opus Dei and do not have jobs outside the centers.

Associates
Associates are faithful of Opus Dei who make themselves fully available to God and to others in apostolic celibacy, and stably take on at least one (sometimes more) apostolic assignment(s) from the Prelature in giving doctrinal and ascetical formation and/or coordinating activities. They differ from numeraries in not making themselves "fully" available to staff the official undertakings of the Prelature, instead giving themselves in additional social realities, such as through their profession or to their own families. Because of this difference in availability for the official activities of Opus Dei, unlike numeraries the associates do not live in Opus Dei centers but maintain their own abodes.  Some of their family life (emotional and social support) comes from the centers of Opus Dei, some from other associates of Opus Dei, and some from their personal families and friends; the precise ratio of this distribution depends upon the circumstances of the individual associate.

Priests
The priests of Opus Dei comprise about 2% of the membership. They always hail from among the male numeraries and associates and have typically lived as lay members for several years before their ordination. At their ordination, they are incardinated into the Personal Prelature of the Holy Cross and Opus Dei, meaning the prelate of Opus Dei becomes their bishop. Priests of Opus Dei observe the same disciplines as numerary and associate members, including living in Opus Dei centers.

The Priestly Society of the Holy Cross is an integral part of Opus Dei, not a separate entity simply associated with Opus Dei.  Part of the society is made up of the clergy of the Opus Dei prelature—members of the priesthood who fall under the jurisdiction of the Opus Dei prelature are automatically members of the Priestly Society.  Other members in the society are traditional diocesan priests--- clergy who remain under the jurisdiction of their diocesan bishop.  Technically speaking, such diocesan priests have not "joined" Opus Dei membership, although they have joined a society that is closely affiliated with Opus Dei.

Cooperators
The Cooperators of Opus Dei are those who, though not considered members by Opus Dei, collaborate in some way with Opus Dei—usually through praying, charitable contributions, or by providing some other assistance.  Cooperators are not required to be celibate or to adhere to any other special requirements.  Indeed, cooperators are not even required to be Christian.

Cooperators may attend the educational and training activities provided by the Opus Dei.  Many cooperators are relatives, friends, colleagues and neighbors of the members of Opus Dei. Religious communities as a whole can also become cooperators of Opus Dei. There are currently several hundred of these communities who pray for Opus Dei daily.

Admission and Incorporation
To become a member of Opus Dei one has to receive a divine calling or a vocation, a calling which requires practising the modes of the Opus Dei prelature. For this the directors of Opus Dei will have to discern if someone does have the vocation, before allowing him to be incorporated into the prelature.

Incorporation into Opus Dei is done through a contractual bond between the person who has the vocation and the prelature.

Manner of incorporation

There are some key procedures that be followed for someone to become a member of Opus Dei:

FreedomIn order to join Opus Dei a person must freely ask to do so, in the personal conviction of having received this divine vocation. He may find this out through his prayer and usually with the help of a spiritual director.
AdulthoodIn accordance with canon law, no one may be juridically incorporated into the prelature until he has reached 18 years of age.

Nevertheless, from the age of 14 years and 6 months, a young person can show his interest in the organization, and begin to participate in its activities: recollections, retreats, seminars, spiritual direction, apostolate.
 
Written requestThe request is made in writing.

Acceptance by the prelatureThe request needs to have been accepted by the authorities of the prelature and admission is granted after a minimum of six months. After a period of at least a year, the interested person can be incorporated temporarily to the prelature by means of a formal declaration of contractual nature.  This is known as oblation, and is renewable annually.

Stages of membership: Admission and incorporation

Admission is granted after a minimum of six months.

After an additional period of at least one year since the moment of his admission, the person can be temporarily incorporated into the prelature (oblation) through a formal declaration of a contractual nature, which is renewable annually.

After a minimum of five more years, the incorporation can become definitive.  This step is called Fidelity, that ties to perpetuity to the member of the Opus Dei. If the member wishes to leave the prelature, he needs a dispensation which the Prelate alone can grant.

If anyone, before incorporation as a Numerary or Associate is seen to lack suitability for that, he may be retained as a Supernumerary, as long as he has the requisite conditions.

Content of the incorporation and contract

On the part of the prelature: The prelature is committed to provide the member with formation in the Catholic Christian faith and in the spirit of the Work, as well as the necessary pastoral care from the priests of the prelature.

On the part of the person to be incorporated: incorporation means the commitment to remain under the jurisdiction of the prelate in all that concerns the aim of the prelature: sanctity and apostolate in the middle of the world. He is also to observe the norms by which the prelature is governed, and to fulfill the other obligations of its faithful.

In summary, all the faithful of the prelature commit themselves to seeking sanctity and to carrying out apostolate according to the spirit of Opus Dei. This involves, principally, growing in spiritual life through prayer, sacrifice, and receiving the sacraments; using the opportunities that the prelature provides for acquiring a deep knowledge of the doctrine of the Church and the spirit of Opus Dei; and taking part in the task of spreading the Word carried out by the prelature, according to the circumstances and situations of each person.

Cessation of the bond and "lawful" departure

At the end of the term of the contract with the prelature the bond with the prelature of Opus Dei ceases. It can also end earlier, if the member requests for it in agreement with the directors of the Opus Dei.  If permission for departure is given it is considered a "lawful departure" ("exitus legitimus" according to the currently applicable Latin version of Opus Statutes).

When someone leaves the prelature lawfully, there is a cessation or ending of mutual rights and duties.
Opus Dei does not give back any goods or money received during membership.
29."During temporary incorporation or when the definitive [incorporation] has already been made, for anyone to voluntarily leave the Praelature, he needs a dispensation which the Prelate alone can grant, after hearing from his own Council and Regional Commission".

30."The faithful, either temporarily or finally incorporated into the Prelature, cannot be dismissed except for serious causes which, if it is a question of final incorporation, always ought to proceed from the fault of the faithful person, himself".

"Bad health is not a reason for dismissal unless it has certainly been established that it was deceitfully concealed or dissembled before temporary incorporation".

34."The person, who for whatever reason says farewell to the Prelature or is dismissed by it, can demand no recompense from it for services rendered to it, nor on account of what, whether by [his] industry or exercise of his own profession, or by any title or manner might have been paid him".

In other words, no departing member of Opus Dei may receive any compensation of any sort for the contributions that they may have made to Opus Dei during their time in the organisation, this applies to all categories of membership.
 
When, however, someone leaves the prelature unlawfully (i.e. without the permission of the Prelate) he or she commits sin.

Jurisdictional issues
Nevertheless, the Congregation for Bishops states: "The laity incorporated in the Prelature Opus Dei continue to be faithful of the dioceses in which they have their domicile or quasidomicile and are, therefore, under the jurisdiction of the diocesan bishop in what the law lays down for all the ordinary faithful".

References
 1982 Statutes of Opus Dei—Latin and English (unauthorized translation)
 —An investigative study by an American journalist
 —a French scholar's synthesis, himself a member of the Opus Dei.
 —an investigation (Un'indagine, the original Italian title) done by a journalist
 —a study of an Italian essayist
 —the first serious study on Opus Dei to be published, written by a French journalist

Notes

External links
 Opus Dei Blogs - central hub of internet sources